Mykyta Barabanov (born 26 May 2001) is a Ukrainian athlete. He competed in the mixed 4 × 400 metres relay event at the 2020 Summer Olympics held in Tokyo, Japan. He also competed as Oxana Boturchuk's sighted guide in the women's 100 metres T12 and women's 400 metres T12 events at the 2020 Summer Paralympics, also held in Tokyo, Japan.

References

External links
 

2001 births
Living people
Ukrainian male sprinters
Athletes (track and field) at the 2020 Summer Olympics
Olympic athletes of Ukraine
Place of birth missing (living people)